Rolando Salinas (born 1 November 1889, date of death unknown) was a Chilean racewalker. He competed in the 10 km walk at the 1912 Summer Olympics.

References

1889 births
Year of death missing
Chilean male racewalkers
Olympic athletes of Chile
Athletes (track and field) at the 1912 Summer Olympics
People from San Felipe, Chile